Thaumastella is a genus of true bugs belonging to the monotypic family Thaumastellidae.

Species:
 Thaumastella aradoides Horvath, 1896 
 Thaumastella elizabethae Schaefer & Wilson, 1971 
 Thaumastella namaquaensis Jacobs, 1989

References

Heteroptera
Heteroptera genera